James Chaplin Higgins (December 25, 1918 – February 12, 2002) was an American professional basketball player. He played in the National Basketball League for the Hammond Ciesar All-Americans in one game during the 1940–41 season and scored one point.

Higgins was also a minor league baseball player. He played for the Baltimore Orioles (minor league team), Federalsburg A's, Dover Orioles, Appleton Papermakers, and Vicksburg Hill Billies.

References 

1918 births
2002 deaths
American men's basketball players
Appleton Papermakers players
Baltimore Orioles (IL) players
Baseball players from Illinois
Basketball players from Illinois
Centers (basketball)
Dover Orioles players
Federalsburg A's players
Hammond Ciesar All-Americans players
People from Olney, Illinois
Vicksburg Hill Billies players